Pierre de Bar (died 11 January 1253, Perugia) was a French Cardinal. He is also tentatively identified as a scholastic philosopher, at the University of Paris around 1230. Some sources indicate that he entered Cistercian Order but more recent research conclude that he was secular priest. He was chancellor of the diocese of Noyon from 1232 until his promotion to the cardinalate.

He was created cardinal by Pope Innocent IV, initially as priest of S. Marcello on 28 May 1244, and then as cardinal-bishop of Sabina in 1251/52, shortly before his death. He subscribed papal bulls between 27 September 1244 and 12 June 1252. His election to the see of Noyon in 1250 was not ratified by Innocent IV.

There is a portrait of him with Mary Magdalen, by Giotto, in the basilica of San Francesco d'Assisi.

Bibliography
Agostino Paravicini Bagliani, Cardinali di curia e "familiae" cardinalizie dal 1227 al 1254, Padova 1972, pp. 213–220

Notes

External links
Biography

1253 deaths
13th-century French cardinals
Cardinal-bishops of Palestrina
Cardinal-bishops of Sabina
Scholastic philosophers
Diplomats of the Holy See
Academic staff of the University of Paris
Year of birth unknown
13th-century philosophers